Church Hill Theatre is a Category B listed pink sandstone former church and current theatre venue owned by the Edinburgh City Council. Built originally as Morningside Free Church, the council purchased it in 1960. After undergoing an extensive refurbishment, it re-opened in August 2006. It is managed by the team operating the Assembly Rooms.

History
It was built in 1892 as North Morningside Free Church to a design by Hippolyte Blanc and purchased by Edinburgh's town council in 1960.

Current use
It is a popular venue for amateur drama productions, as well as for the Edinburgh Festival Fringe and Edinburgh International Festival. Some of the non-professional theatre and dance companies it hosts include Lothian Youth Arts And Musicals Company, Tempo, Showcase, Edinburgh Telephone Choir, Edinburgh Music Theatre Company, Leitheatre, Edinburgh University Footlights, Buckstone Youth Dance, Manor School of Ballet and Edinburgh Dance Academy.

Facilities
The theatre auditorium seats 353, and the building has space for smaller functions. Since the renovation, there is now lift access to the auditorium, as well as a privately run cafe

References

Hippolyte Blanc buildings
Edinburgh Festival
Theatre in Edinburgh